Ireby and Uldale is a civil parish in the English county of Cumbria forming part of the district of Allerdale. The population, including Bewaldeth and Snittlegarth at the 2011 Census was 458.

The principal settlements in the civil parish are Ireby and Uldale.

Governance
Ireby and Uldale is part of the parliamentary constituency of Workington. In the December 2019 general election, the Conservative Party candidate for Workington, Mark Jenkinson, was elected the MP, overturning a 9.4 per cent Labour majority from the 2017 election to eject shadow environment secretary Sue Hayman by a margin of 4,136 votes. Until the December 2019 general election The Labour Party has won the seat in the constituency in every general election since 1979.The Conservative Party has only been elected once in Workington since World War II, at the 1976 by-election.

Before Brexit for the European Parliament its residents voted to elect MEP's for the North West England constituency.

Ireby and Uldale has its own Parish Council; Ireby and Uldale Parish Council.

See also

Listed buildings in Ireby and Uldale

References

External links
 Cumbria County History Trust: Ireby, Low (nb: provisional research only – see Talk page)
 Cumbria County History Trust: Ireby, High (nb: provisional research only – see Talk page)
  Cumbria County History Trust: Uldale (nb: provisional research only - see Talk page)
Parish council contacts

Civil parishes in Cumbria
Allerdale